Flávio de Melo (born 21 June 1965) is a Brazilian rower. He competed in the men's coxed pair event at the 1988 Summer Olympics.

References

1965 births
Living people
Brazilian male rowers
Olympic rowers of Brazil
Rowers at the 1988 Summer Olympics
Place of birth missing (living people)
Pan American Games medalists in rowing
Pan American Games silver medalists for Brazil
Rowers at the 1987 Pan American Games